Frederico Rodrigues de Oliveira (4 April 1949 – 29 May 2022), known as just Fred, was a Brazilian footballer who played as a centre-back. He competed in the men's tournament at the 1972 Summer Olympics.

References

External links
 

1949 births
2022 deaths
Brazilian footballers
Footballers from Rio de Janeiro (city)
Association football central defenders
Brazil international footballers
Olympic footballers of Brazil
Footballers at the 1972 Summer Olympics
CR Flamengo footballers
CR Vasco da Gama players
Bangu Atlético Clube players
Volta Redonda FC players
Botafogo de Futebol e Regatas players